Humberside County Council was the county council of the non-metropolitan county of Humberside in northern England.

History
Humberside was a non-metropolitan county governed by Humberside County Council and nine non-metropolitan district councils. The county council came into its powers on 1 April 1974 and was abolished in 1996. The county council was based at County Hall in Beverley. On 1 April 1996 the county council was replaced with four unitary authorities: North Lincolnshire, North East Lincolnshire, Kingston upon Hull and East Riding of Yorkshire.

Political control
The first election to the council was held in 1973, initially operating as a shadow authority before coming into its powers on 1 April 1974. Political control of the council from 1973 until its abolition in 1996  was held by the following parties:

Leadership
The leaders of the council included:

Council elections
1973 Humberside County Council election
1977 Humberside County Council election
1981 Humberside County Council election
1985 Humberside County Council election
1989 Humberside County Council election
1993 Humberside County Council election

County result maps

References

Former county councils of England
1974 establishments in England
1996 disestablishments in England
County Council
 
Council elections in Humberside
County council elections in England